The Canso Canal is a short canal located in Nova Scotia, Canada.

Canal location

The Canso Canal is in the Strait of Canso, on the eastern side of the Canso Causeway, a rock-fill causeway which opened in 1955 to carry a 2-lane highway and a single rail track from Cape Breton Island to mainland Nova Scotia. The canal was built through Balache Point in Inverness County.

The causeway completely blocks the Strait of Canso, which links the waters of St. George's Bay in the Northumberland Strait, a sub-basin of the Gulf of St. Lawrence, with Chedabucto Bay on the Atlantic Ocean.

Canal dimensions

It has a single Seawaymax lock to account for tidal differences; any vessel capable of transiting the St. Lawrence Seaway will fit through the Canso Canal.

The Canso Canal Bridge is a  swing bridge which carries the Trans-Canada Highway and a railway line across the canal immediately south of the southern end of the lock.

Canal operation
Vessels entering St. George's Bay to the west of the canal, or Chedabucto Bay to the east, must comply with a Vessel Traffic System operated by the Canadian Coast Guard.

An average of 2,069 ships, with an average gross tonnage of 1.88 million tons pass through the Canso Canal each year. About 85 per cent of vessel traffic is owned or operated by shipping companies, fishermen and government, the remainder being pleasure craft users.

Further reading
http://www.virtualmuseum.ca/virtual-exhibits/exhibit/the-canso-causeways-history-and-impact The Canso Causeway's History and Impact

References

External links
- Information from the Canadian Coast Guard

Ship canals
Canals in Nova Scotia
Transport in Inverness County, Nova Scotia
Buildings and structures in Inverness County, Nova Scotia
Canals opened in 1955
1955 establishments in Nova Scotia